Mahjan (also Romanized as Mahjān and Mah Jān; also known as Mahgān, Maigān, and Meygān) is a village in Aspas Rural District, Sedeh District, Eqlid County, Fars Province, Iran. At the 2006 census, its population was 513, in 101 families.

References 

Populated places in Eqlid County